The Mokoreta River is a river in Southland, New Zealand. A tributary of the Mataura River, its source is between Mt Rosebery and Catlins Cone, close to the source of the Catlins River. It flows westward from the Catlins Ranges into the Southland Plains.

Rivers of Southland, New Zealand
The Catlins
Rivers of New Zealand
Southland District